USA-231, or ORS-1 (Operationally Responsive Space-1) is an American reconnaissance satellite which was launched in 2011 from NASA’s Wallops Flight Facility, Virginia by a Minotaur I launch vehicle. It is the first operational satellite of the Operationally Responsive Space Office. It is equipped with a SYERS 2A sensor.

ORS-1 satellite is designed to provide orbital space imagery of Southwest Asia and to enhance battlespace awareness to operational field commanders. The ORS-1 will undergo a 30-day trial and adjustment check before the ORS Office turns over it operations to USAF's 1st Space Operations Squadron at Schriever AFB, Colorado.

SYERS
SYERS 2 is an optical and infrared camera with a 40 cm aperture and a field of view larger than 2 degrees. It uses Time Delay and Integration CCD sensors to compensate for ground motion, resulting in a resolution of 1m (NIIRS 4) from a nominal 300 km orbit. SYERS 2 is supplied by the Goodrich Corporation.

SYERS is also carried by the Lockheed U-2 reconnaissance aircraft.

See also

2011 in spaceflight

References

External links
NASA web page on ORS 1
SYERS 2 Reconnaissance Sensor (Goodrich acquired by UTS Aerospace, link now broken – try ISR systems and )
 ORS-1 at eoPortal Directory

Spacecraft launched in 2011
Spacecraft launched by Minotaur rockets
USA satellites